USS Davey (WYT-81) was a United States Navy harbor entrance patrol and boarding vessel in service at Pilot Town, Louisiana during World War I.

Davey, originally a tug, was transferred by the United States Coast Guard to the Navy in April 1917. She was returned to the Coast Guard in 1919.

Nothing more is known about Davey

References

Ships of the United States Coast Guard
World War I auxiliary ships of the United States
Ships built in Delaware
1908 ships